Leopold Flam (16 March 1912 – 29 September 1995) was a Belgian philosopher. Together with Alphonse De Waelhens, Chaïm Perelman and Rudolf Boehm, he was one of leading philosophers of Belgium from the 1960s until the 1980s.

Born in Antwerp, Flam studied social sciences, political history, philosophy at the University of Ghent and obtained a PhD in history. During World War II he was imprisoned in the Dossin Barracks at Mechelen and in the Buchenwald concentration camp. After the war he became a professor at the Free University of Brussels.
 
He founded the Vlaamse vereniging voor Wijsbegeerte (1959) (E: Flemish League for Philosophy), later of Aurora. He became director of the magazine Geschiedenis in het onderwijs (E: History in education).

Flam died at his home in Vilvoorde, near Brussels, on 29 September 1995.

Bibliography
 Gestalten van de Westerse subjectiviteit, Wereldbibliotheek, 1965 
 Naar de Dageraad, Kroniek en getuigenis van de oorlogsjaren 1943–45, VUBpress, 1996

Sources
 Leopold Flam

1912 births
1995 deaths
20th-century Belgian philosophers
Belgian Jews
Jewish philosophers
Ghent University alumni
Writers from Antwerp
Buchenwald concentration camp survivors